Mehr Rural District is a rural district (dehestan) in Bashtin District, Davarzan County, Razavi Khorasan Province, Iran. The rural district was created effective 15 May 2012.  As of 2006, its population was 5,809, in 1,662 families. The rural district has 11 villages.

References 

Rural Districts of Razavi Khorasan Province
Davarzan County
2012 establishments in Iran